Jidu Auto is a joint venture between Chinese car company Geely and Baidu. Jidu Auto was founded in March 2021 as an intelligent electric vehicle company mainly focused on the development of electric vehicles and intends to release a full portfolio of electric vehicles in different segments starting in 2022.

In June 2022, Jidu Auto unveiled its first concept ROBO-01 in the form of a pre-production vehicle. The ROBO-01 rides on the Sustainable Experience Architecture (SEA) platform, a modular electric vehicle platform developed by Geely Holding.

The Jidu Auto vehicles will be manufactured in Hangzhou Bay in Ningbo, where Geely's headquarter  and several Geely plants are located.

Products
Jidu ROBO-01 – all electric midsize crossover.
Jidu ROBO-02 – all electric midsize sedan.

References

External links

Official website (in Chinese)

Geely brands
Vehicle manufacturing companies established in 2021